El M'Ghair District (also written El Meghaier District) is a district of El M'Ghair Province, Algeria. As of the 2008 census, it has a population of 72,387.

Communes 

El M'Ghair District consists of four communes:
El M'Ghair
Oum Touyour
Sidi Khellil
Still

References 

Districts of El M'Ghair Province